Julie & Julia is a 2009 American biographical comedy-drama film written and directed by Nora Ephron starring Meryl Streep, Amy Adams, Stanley Tucci, and Chris Messina. The film contrasts the life of chef Julia Child in the early years of her culinary career with the life of young New Yorker Julie Powell, who aspires to cook all 524 recipes in Child's cookbook in 365 days, a challenge she described on her popular blog, which made her a published author.

Ephron's screenplay is based on two books: My Life in France, Child's autobiography written with Alex Prud'homme, and a memoir by Powell, Julie & Julia: 365 Days, 524 Recipes, 1 Tiny Apartment Kitchen (later retitled Julie & Julia: My Year of Cooking Dangerously). Both of these books were written and published  between 2004 and 2006. Powell's book was based on her blog The Julie/Julia Project, where she documented online her daily experiences cooking each of the 524 recipes in Child's 1961 cookbook Mastering the Art of French Cooking. The film is the first major motion picture based on a blog.

In March 2008, Ephron began filming with Streep as Child and Adams as Powell. On July 30, 2009, the film officially premiered at the Ziegfeld Theatre in New York; and, on August 7, 2009, it opened throughout North America. It received positive reviews from critics, who praised Streep's performance. Streep and Adams previously starred together in Doubt (2008). Streep and Tucci previously starred together in The Devil Wears Prada (2006).

Julie & Julia was Ephron's last film before her death in 2012.

Plot
The film is presented in a series of flashbacks between present-day and past, jumping between various moments in both Julie and Julia's lives. The following plot summary separates the plot based on character.

Julia Child – 1950s 
In the 1950s, Julia Child, an enthusiastic and unabashed woman, moves to Paris with her diplomat husband, Paul Child. She attends Le Cordon Bleu to learn French cooking and is initially met with skepticism as she is the only woman in the class. Madame Elizabeth Brassart, the proprietress of the school, clashes with Julia. However, Julia is undaunted and begins collaborating on a book about French cooking for American housewives with Simone Beck and Louisette Bertholle.

Julia continues to work diligently on the book, despite such obstacles as Paul being repeatedly reassigned, Louisette's less-than-diligent efforts on the project (she's eventually told she will get a smaller share of the royalties than Julia and Simone), and Paul's being investigated for allegedly "un-American activities."

Although Julia's book is rejected by Houghton Mifflin as too long and complicated, it is ultimately accepted and published by Alfred A. Knopf.

Julie Powell – 2002 
In 2002, Julie Powell has an unpleasant job at the Lower Manhattan Development Corporation's call center, where she answers telephone calls from victims of the September 11 attacks and members of the general public complaining about the LMDC's controversial plans for rebuilding the World Trade Center.

To do something she enjoys, she decides to cook every recipe in Julia Child's 1961 book Mastering the Art of French Cooking in one year while blogging about it. Her husband Eric initially supports her in this and she gains a following, but tension develops when Julie starts to get conceited and prioritize her blog and readers over their marriage. He temporarily leaves after an argument, after which Julie expresses remorse in her blog. Finally, Julie is visited by a food writer from The New York Times, who features her blog in a story, after which her project begins to receive the attention of journalists, literary agents, and publishers.

Julie is hurt when a journalist tells her that Child was critical of Julie's blog project, but she retains her love and gratitude for Child and the inspiration she provided. The last scenes show Powell and her husband visiting a reconstruction of Child's kitchen at the Smithsonian Institution, and Child in the same kitchen at her home receiving a first print edition of her cookbook and celebrating the event with her husband.

Cast

 Meryl Streep as Julia Child
 Amy Adams as Julie Powell
 Stanley Tucci as Paul Child, Julia's husband
 Chris Messina as Eric Powell, Julie's husband
 Linda Emond as Simone Beck ("Simca"), with whom Julia wrote Mastering the Art of French Cooking
 Helen Carey as Louisette Bertholle, co-author of Mastering the Art of French Cooking
 Jane Lynch as Dorothy Dean Cousins, Julia's sister
 Mary Lynn Rajskub as Sarah, Julie's friend
 Joan Juliet Buck as Madame Elisabeth Brassart of Le Cordon Bleu, where Julia studied French cooking
Amanda Hesser as herself
 Deborah Rush as Avis DeVoto, Julia's long-time pen pal
 Vanessa Ferlito as Cassie, Julie's acquaintance
 Casey Wilson as Regina, Julie's acquaintance
 Jillian Bach as Annabelle, Julie's acquaintance
 Frances Sternhagen as Irma Rombauer
 Françoise Lebrun as The Baker's Mother
 Mary Kay Place as the voice of Mrs. Foster, Julie's mother
 Erin Dilly as Judith Jones, Julia's editor and friend

Release
On its opening weekend, the film opened #2 behind G.I. Joe: The Rise of Cobra with $20.1 million. Julie & Julia ended up grossing $94.1 million in the United States and Canada, and earned a worldwide total of $129.5 million.

Reception
The film received positive reviews from critics, and Streep's performance was highly acclaimed by critics. Rotten Tomatoes gave the film a score of 78% based on 227 reviews, with an average score of 6.7/10 with a "Certified Fresh" rating, and the site's critical consensus states: "Boosted by Meryl Streep's charismatic performance as Julia Child, Julie & Julia is a light, but fairly entertaining culinary comedy." Metacritic, which assigns a rating out of 100 top reviews from mainstream critics, gave it an average score of 66% based on 34 reviews, indicating "generally favorable reviews".

Los Angeles Times critic Kenneth Turan commented: "[Julie & Julia] does it right. A consummate entertainment that echoes the rhythms and attitudes of classic Hollywood, it's a satisfying throwback to those old-fashioned movie fantasies where impossible dreams do come true. And, in this case, it really happened. Twice."The A.V. Club gave the film a C, explaining, "Julie & Julia is two movies in one. That's one more movie than it needs to be." Entertainment Weekly gave it a B+. The review by Slate was also positive.

Streep has been widely praised for her performance as Child. Movie critic A. O. Scott of The New York Times affirmed: "By now [Streep] has exhausted every superlative that exists and to suggest that she has outdone herself is only to say that she's done it again. Her performance goes beyond physical imitation, though she has the rounded shoulders and the fluting voice down perfectly." Reviewer Peter Travers wrote in Rolling Stone that "Streep—at her brilliant, beguiling best—is the spice that does the trick for the yummy Julie & Julia." Similarly, Stephanie Zacharek of Salon concluded that "Streep isn't playing Julia Child here, but something both more elusive and more truthful—she's playing our idea of Julia Child."

Awards and nominations

See also
 Julia's Kitchen Wisdom

References

External links
 
 
 
 
 
 
 

2009 films
2009 biographical drama films
2009 comedy-drama films
American biographical drama films
American comedy-drama films
American nonlinear narrative films
Columbia Pictures films
Comedy-drama films based on actual events
Cooking films
Films about chefs
Films based on adaptations
Films based on biographies
Films based on Internet-based works
Films based on multiple works
Films directed by Nora Ephron
Films featuring a Best Musical or Comedy Actress Golden Globe winning performance
Films produced by Laurence Mark
Films scored by Alexandre Desplat
Films set in the 1940s
Films set in the 1950s
Films set in the 2000s
Films set in New York City
Films set in Paris
Films shot in New Jersey
Films shot in New York City
Films shot in Paris
Films with screenplays by Nora Ephron
2000s French-language films
Works based on blogs
2000s English-language films
2000s American films